The Imam Ali military base is an Iranian military base located near the eastern Syrian town of Abu Kamal, near the border with Iraq.

History
The base has been constantly undergoing construction since early 2018. Fox News reported on 4 September 2019 that a "classified Iranian project", the Imam Ali military base, was being constructed near Abu Kamal, which was confirmed by satellite images. The project was approved by the top leadership in Tehran and is being completed by the Iranian Quds Force.

On 9 September 2019, reports emerged that "Iranian" or "Iranian-backed militias" had been targeted in airstrikes, which appeared to be similar to a June 2018 airstrike that targeted a Kata'ib Hezbollah base at a similar location. Satellite imagery taken by ImageSat International in late 2019 suggests a tunnel system is being built, which Western intelligence sources believe will hold missiles.

The site has been struck multiple times by the Israeli Air Force after which the construction of tunnels was noticed to have accelerated, and would soon be operational, as of November 2019.

The site was struck again on 25 February 2021 by the United States military in retaliation for multiple rocket attacks against U.S. forces in Iraq ten days earlier, and became the first known offensive military operation carried out under U.S. president Joe Biden. On 28 June 2021, another airstrike targeted the base, which left at least nine Iran-backed Iraqi militia fighters dead and many others injured, according to SOHR.

See also
 Iranian involvement in the Syrian civil war

References

2019 establishments in Syria
Military installations of Iran
Iranian involvement in the Syrian civil war
Deir ez-Zor Governorate in the Syrian civil war